Aluminium hydroxide, Al(OH)3, is found in nature as the mineral gibbsite (also known as hydrargillite) and its three much rarer polymorphs: bayerite, doyleite, and nordstrandite. Aluminium hydroxide is amphoteric, i.e., it has both basic and acidic properties. Closely related are aluminium oxide hydroxide, AlO(OH), and aluminium oxide or alumina (Al2O3), the latter of which is also amphoteric. These compounds together are the major components of the aluminium ore bauxite. Aluminium hydroxide also forms a gelatinous precipitate in water.

Structure
Al(OH)3 is built up of double layers of hydroxyl groups with aluminium ions occupying two-thirds of the octahedral holes between the two layers. Four polymorphs are recognized. All feature layers of octahedral aluminium hydroxide units, with hydrogen bonds between the layers. The polymorphs differ in terms of the stacking of the layers. All forms of Al(OH)3 crystals are hexagonal :
gibbsite is also known as γ-Al(OH)3  or α-Al(OH)3 
bayerite is also known as α-Al(OH)3  or β-alumina trihydrate
nordstrandite is also known as Al(OH)3
doyleite

Hydrargillite, once thought to be aluminium hydroxide, is an aluminium phosphate. Nonetheless, both gibbsite and hydrargillite refer to the same polymorphism of aluminium hydroxide, with gibbsite used most commonly in the United States and hydrargillite used more often in Europe. Hydrargillite is named after the Greek words for water and clay.

Properties
Aluminium hydroxide is amphoteric. In acid, it acts as a Brønsted–Lowry base. It neutralizes the acid, yielding a salt:
 3 HCl + Al(OH)3 → AlCl3 + 3 H2O

In bases, it acts as a Lewis acid by binding hydroxide ions:
 Al(OH)3 + OH− → Al(OH)4−

Production

The waste solid, bauxite tailings, is removed and aluminium hydroxide is precipitated from the remaining solution of sodium aluminate. This aluminium hydroxide can be converted to aluminium oxide or alumina by calcination.

The residue or bauxite tailings, which is mostly iron oxide, is highly caustic due to residual sodium hydroxide. It was historically stored in lagoons; this led to the Ajka alumina plant accident in 2010 in Hungary, where a dam bursting led to the drowning of nine people. An additional 122 sought treatment for chemical burns. The mud contaminated  of land and reached the Danube. While the mud was considered non-toxic due to low levels of heavy metals, the associated slurry had a pH of 13.

Uses

Fire retardant filler
Aluminium hydroxide also finds use as a fire retardant filler for polymer applications. It is selected for these applications because it is colorless (like most polymers), inexpensive, and has good fire retardant properties. Magnesium hydroxide and mixtures of huntite and hydromagnesite are used similarly. In addition to behaving as a fire retardant, it is very effective as a smoke suppressant in a wide range of polymers, most especially in polyesters, acrylics, ethylene vinyl acetate, epoxies, polyvinyl chloride (PVC) and rubber.

Precursor to Al compounds
Aluminium hydroxide is a feedstock for the manufacture of other aluminium compounds: calcined aluminas, aluminium sulfate, polyaluminium chloride, aluminium chloride, zeolites, sodium aluminate, activated alumina, and aluminium nitrate.

Freshly precipitated aluminium hydroxide forms gels, which are the basis for the application of aluminium salts as flocculants in water purification. This gel crystallizes with time. Aluminium hydroxide gels can be dehydrated (e.g. using water-miscible non-aqueous solvents like ethanol) to form an amorphous aluminium hydroxide powder, which is readily soluble in acids. Heating converts it to activated aluminas, which are used as desiccants, adsorbent in gas purification, and catalyst supports.

Pharmaceutical
Under the generic name "algeldrate", aluminium hydroxide is used as an antacid in humans and animals (mainly cats and dogs). It is preferred over other alternatives such as sodium bicarbonate because Al(OH)3, being insoluble, does not increase the pH of stomach above 7 and hence, does not trigger secretion of excess acid by the stomach. Brand names include Alu-Cap, Aludrox, Gaviscon or Pepsamar. It reacts with excess acid in the stomach, reducing the acidity of the stomach content, which may relieve the symptoms of ulcers, heartburn or dyspepsia. Such products can cause constipation, because the aluminium ions inhibit the contractions of smooth muscle cells in the gastrointestinal tract, slowing peristalsis and lengthening the time needed for stool to pass through the colon. Some such products are formulated to minimize such effects through the inclusion of equal concentrations of magnesium hydroxide or magnesium carbonate, which have counterbalancing laxative effects.

This compound is also used to control hyperphosphatemia (elevated phosphate, or phosphorus, levels in the blood) in people and animals suffering from kidney failure. Normally, the kidneys filter excess phosphate out from the blood, but kidney failure can cause phosphate to accumulate. The aluminium salt, when ingested, binds to phosphate in the intestines and reduce the amount of phosphorus that can be absorbed.

Precipitated aluminium hydroxide is included as an adjuvant in some vaccines (e.g. anthrax vaccine). One of the well-known brands of aluminium hydroxide adjuvant is Alhydrogel, made by Brenntag Biosector. Since it absorbs protein well, it also functions to stabilize vaccines by preventing the proteins in the vaccine from precipitating or sticking to the walls of the container during storage. Aluminium hydroxide is sometimes called "alum", a term generally reserved for one of several sulfates.

Vaccine formulations containing aluminium hydroxide stimulate the immune system by inducing the release of uric acid, an immunological danger signal. This strongly attracts certain types of monocytes which differentiate into dendritic cells. The dendritic cells pick up the antigen, carry it to lymph nodes, and stimulate T cells and B cells. It appears to contribute to induction of a good Th2 response, so is useful for immunizing against pathogens that are blocked by antibodies. However, it has little capacity to stimulate cellular (Th1) immune responses, important for protection against many pathogens, nor is it useful when the antigen is peptide-based.

Safety
In the 1960s and 1970s it was speculated that aluminium was related to various neurological disorders, including Alzheimer's disease. Since then, multiple epidemiological studies have found no connection between exposure to environmental or swallowed aluminium and neurological disorders, though injected aluminium was not looked at in these studies.

Neural disorders were found in experiments on mice motivated by Gulf War illness (GWI). Aluminum hydroxide injected in doses equivalent to those administered to the United States military, showed increased reactive astrocytes, increased apoptosis of motor neurons and microglial proliferation within the spinal cord and cortex.

References

External links
 International Chemical Safety Card 0373
 "Some properties of aluminum hydroxide precipitated in the presence of clays", Soil Research Institute, R C Turner, Department of Agriculture, Ottawa
 Effect of ageing on properties of polynuclear hydroxyaluminum cations
 A second species of polynuclear hydroxyaluminum cation, its formation and some of its properties

Aluminium compounds
Amphoteric compounds
Antacids
Hydroxides
Inorganic compounds
Phosphate binders
Flame retardants